Durium was an Italian record label, active from 1935 to 1989. Part of the catalogue and the brand were subsequently taken over by Ricordi, who used it for some reissues. Its initial trademark consisted of the writing Durium in block letters, surmounted by the stylisation of three trumpets and an eagle. Immediately after the war, this logo was abandoned to move to the stylisation of a disk with three internal rays crossed by the writing Durium in italics.

History

Early years 
Durium SA was founded in 1935 in Milan (originally as Durium La Voce dell'Impero) by a group of Milanese entrepreneurs including Martinengo and Alberto Airoldi, who became its president. The headquarters were in Corso Garibaldi in Milan and production covered both discs and sound producers.

The first records released were recitations of tales for children, and other productions aimed at emigrants and troops abroad. In the years 1935/1936 - lacking the material for the production - discs were also published on cardboard supports, containing language courses, technical courses, and propaganda. With the outbreak of war the offices and some recording studios were transferred from Milan to Erba.

Development 
At the end of the Second World War after the return to Milan in the new headquarters in the passage of the Osii 2 the company, meanwhile become Durium, moves the administrative and representation offices in via Manzoni. The core of what will be the burning and printing remains in Erba.

It is a period of economic difficulties linked to the still immature Italian discography; the financial position stabilizes in 1948 with the entry into the society of the Armenian-born entrepreneur Krikor Mintanjan (whose surname is sometimes Italianized in Mintangian) who nominates his wife Elisabel responsible director and assumes as artistic director the nephew of the co-founder Alberto, Aurelio Airoldi, who will remain in the company until 1987, and the pianist, arranger, and composer Franco Cassano, who will remain at the direction until 1986.

In addition to directing the record company, Cassano publishes several albums for the label as a pianist and writes several hits for their artists such as Sei divent nera for Los Marcellos Ferial, also recorded in Chinese, Melodia for Jimmy Fontana, brought to success in the Kingdom Engaged by Engelbert Humperdinck with the title The Way It Used to Be and which will be engraved in the world in several other languages.

It is above all the scouting activity of new artists, as well as the development of new promotion and sales strategies, to relaunch the label. In the fifties, while the Italian discography has its own identity with the birth of record companies such as RCA Italiana and CGD, new artists are produced such as Aurelio Fierro, Flo Sandon's, Roberto Murolo and Marino Marini, giving a great boost to the activity in light music.

In the sixties are promoted characters like Little Tony, Los Marcellos Ferial, Rocky Roberts, Bruno Venturini, Le Snobs, Wess, Dori Ghezzi, Fausto Papetti, Passengers, Camaleonti, Nini Rosso, I Vianella; artists who enjoy a strong support thanks to the director of the press office of the record company Luciano Giacotto who in the same years is also director of the youth music magazine Ciao Amici, as well as producer.

The Durium sensed since the fifties the importance of distributing licensed foreign music using its increasingly advanced factory in Erba; here is the distribution of international artists such as Al Caiola, Don Costa, James Brown, Paul Anka, Mouth & MacNeal, Donna Summer, Ferrante & Teicher, Dee D. Jackson, Steve Lawrence, Eydie Gormé, Don McLean, Shirley Bassey, Plastic Bertrand, Telex and many others.

In 1977 Durium reached its peak with a net sales increase of 35% compared to the previous year, for a total of 6.25 million dollars at the time.

Corporate structure 
In a short time Durium became a leading company in the Italian recording world; even in advance of many multinational companies, already in the first post-war period he began to create a complete system dedicated to artists: from recording albums to their distribution, also managing printing and promotion.

Regarding the registration, in via Troya (near Piazza Napoli) was set up a well-equipped recording studio kept continuously updated.

At Erba, in via Trieste, the production plant where long-playing was printed and the music cassettes under the responsibility of Valsecchi and then Mario Cvek had been left since the post-war period. The modernization proceeded seamlessly with continuous investments, to the point that in 1977 the plant was distinguished in the Italian landscape for the modernity of the plants and for the quality of work.  Throughout the era of vinyl and audio cassettes, a good part the activity was carried out on behalf of third parties for the most famous and important Italian record companies.

Failure 
In 1981 Durium celebrated its fiftieth anniversary in advance, but sales, thanks to the diffusion of recordable audiocassettes and the spread of music through free radio stations, are already falling sharply: from 800,000 copies a few years earlier, a hit by a number one it can not sell more than 400 000 copies.

The crisis worsens in the second half of the eighties, coinciding with the diffusion of CDs and at the same time with many record companies: in 1986 Krikor Mintanjan abandoned the company, taken over by Luca Rinaldi, who subsequently sold it to Enrico Rovelli; the same man who also bought Ariston Records in the same period.

Despite this in the eighties continues the activity of scouting leading to the success of many artists, including Vanadium, one of the first Italian heavy metal bands, and a young Fiordaliso that launches at the Sanremo Festival hits like Una Dirty Poetry, Oramai and I do not want not the moon.

Rovelli then tries to restructure the company, which involves the abandonment of production and printing, that is the now too expensive Erba plant, and the outsourcing of recording and mixing of disks, thus also abandoning the studies in Piazza Napoli.

The same Rovelli tries to establish a company, Kono Records, with the intention of merging the catalogues of Durium and Ariston, but because of the liabilities accumulated by the two companies the operation is not successful.

The Kono therefore born as an independent record company incorporating some artists of the Ariston and Durium, which both cease all operations in 1989. The offices of the registered office, in via Manzoni, are also abandoned.

Durium catalogue 
While Rovelli will continue his career as a manager of many artists, including Vasco Rossi, the catalogs of Durium and Ariston will be at the center of legal disputes, being then sold to Ricordi and subsequently merging into the patrimony of the purchaser BMG. The same Durium brand is acquired by these companies and, although not formally renewed, has been used occasionally to reprint the records of some artists.

Sub-labels 
Like many other record companies, Durium also gave birth to some sub-labels of which the best known is the Italian Targa, which has also released some albums and 45 rpm of Vasco Rossi; in addition, Durium distributed other labels such as Sprint, Titanus and Karim.

The Durium, in addition to having recorded and printed for years respectively artists and media for other companies without factories, has also taken care of the distribution for other record companies. For example, for some years it has been involved in the distribution of the PDU, the record company founded by Mina.

Releases 
Dates below are based on the disc label, or on the vinyl or, finally, on the cover; if none of these elements had a date, on the numbering of the catalogue; if existing, the month and the day are shown over the year.

78 rpm

33 rpm

25 cm

30 cm

45 rpm

Catalogazione Ld A

50s

70s

80s

Circus - Catalogazione CN A 
The Circus was a small label distributed by Durium; it was then acquired by the parent company, which continued to publish 45 rpms using the same catalogue number.

EP - Dischi Circus

45 rpm - Durium Marche Estere 

The Durium Marche Estere was a sub-label of the parent company, which in theory would have had to print disks of foreign origin, although in reality this did not always happen: in some cases it printed discs of songs of soundtracks.

The numbering, however, was preceded by the prefix DE, while in the label (which was different from the durium standard, as it had a large "d" corresponding to the disc hole) there was the writing Durium Marche Estere.

33 rpm - Dischi Adventure 

The Durium distributed (and later took over) also Roman label, Discs Adventure, specializing in launching new artists and publishing of jazz albums. The letter A of the 45 rpm is found in some issues detached from the two letters AV, and in others attached.

EP - Dischi Adventure

45 rpm - Dischi Adventure

33 rpm - Royal series 

As mentioned before, the Royal (whose headquarters was in Via Indipendenza 32 in Naples) was specialized in the launch of new artists, and was shortly after incorporated into the parent company: for this reason the first issues have only the writing Royal, then replaced from Durium - Royal Series, while the numbering of the catalogue continues sequentially and continues with the Royal series. The letter A is found in some issues detached from the two letters QC, and in others attached.

45 rpm - Royal series

EP

45 rpm - Promo Juke-Box

See also 

 Durium Records (UK)
 Record label
 List of record labels

Notes

Bibliography 
 The data concerning the recording of the house were taken from phonographic supports issued and stored (like all those published in Italy) at the Discoteca di Stato in Rome.
 Various issues of magazines Music and discs (vintages from 1959 onwards), Il Musichiere (vintages 1959-1960), TV Sorrisi e Canzoni (vintages from 1959 onwards), Ciao 2001, Here youngsters, Big, Music, and many other magazines of musical argument.
 Mario De Luigi, The record industry in Italy, Side Side editions, Rome, 1982
 Mario De Luigi, History of the phonographic industry in Italy, Music and Dischi editions, Milan, 2008

Italian record labels